Kaden Hensel (born 5 June 1986) is a former Australian tennis player.

Hensel has a career high ATP singles ranking of 390 achieved on 12 July 2010. He also has a career high ATP doubles ranking of 121 achieved on 9 August 2010. Hensel has won 2 ATP Challenger Tour doubles titles as well as 10 ITF Futures doubles titles.

Hensel made his ATP main draw debut at the 2010 Brisbane International, partnering Bernard Tomic. Later that month, Hensel made his grand slam debut at the 2010 Australian Open, partnering Greg Jones. The pair reached the second round where they lost to Ivo Karlović and Dušan Vemić in three sets.

External links
 
 
 
 

1986 births
Living people
Australian male tennis players
Tennis players from Melbourne
Sportspeople from Canberra
Tennis people from the Australian Capital Territory
21st-century Australian people